Darren Scott may refer to:

Darren Scott (cricketer) (born 1972), English cricketer
Darren Scott (Family Affairs), fictional character in the former British soap opera Family Affairs
Darren Scott, known as DRS, part of the Scottish rapper and songwriter duo SHY & DRS